Carlos Reis (born 14 June 1955) is a Portuguese archer. He competed in the men's individual event at the 1988 Summer Olympics.

References

1955 births
Living people
Portuguese male archers
Olympic archers of Portugal
Archers at the 1988 Summer Olympics
Place of birth missing (living people)